Kharqan Rural District may refer to:
 Kharqan Rural District (Hamadan Province)
 Kharqan Rural District (Semnan Province)